Make Trade Fair is a compilation album released by Lower Left Records in 2006. It features 20 songs by a variety of independent and signed bands from around the world.

The goal of the album is to raise awareness of alternatives to sweatshop labor. The proceeds from the album are all being donated to Ten Thousand Villages, an organization started in 1946 that helped pioneer the concept of fair trade by buying crafts directly from artisans in the developing world and paying a living wage.

Track listing
Anti-Flag - "What's the Difference"
Bigwig - "Time Bomb"
Mike Park - "Born to Kill"
Subb - "Make Trade Fair"
Humanifesto - "All These Lives"
Raised Fist - "Killing Revenues"
The Eyeliners - "So What?"
The Resistance - "The Devil's Eye"
Hostage Life - "Nickel Sneakers"
The Flatliners - "Fred's Got Slacks"
La Descente du Coude - L'axe du mal malaxe
Big D and the Kids Table - "You Lost, You're Crazy"
All Ages - "Dirty"
Hiretsukan - "Manual Function"
Machete Avenue - "Cut to Poeces"
I Defy - "Reformation Day"
Nothing Left to Lose - "My America"
Declan De Barra - "Apple Tree"
The Difference - "Set Tears Apart"
Planet Smashers - "Looking for a Cure"

External links
 Website for Lower Left Records

Compilation albums by Canadian artists
Charity albums
2006 compilation albums